Seymour Trieger (12 November 1924 – 10 December 2012) was the second leader of the Green Party of Canada from 1984 to 1988. Trieger first ran in Nanaimo—Cowichan.

He died at the age of 88 in Eugene, Oregon.

References

External links
 Green Party of Canada at The Canadian Encyclopedia

Green Party of Canada leaders
2012 deaths
1924 births
Canadian expatriates in the United States